Sainte-Marie-du-Mont may refer to the following communes in France:

Sainte-Marie-du-Mont, Isère, in the Isère département
Sainte-Marie-du-Mont, Manche, in the Manche département